Salih Šehović (11 May 1936 – 27 January 2022) was a Bosnian professional footballer who played as a forward and spent most of his career in FK Sarajevo.

He is the club's third ranked all time goalscorer, behind Dobrivoje Živkov and legendary Asim Ferhatović. He scored 75 goals in 181 official matches for them.

He died in Bern on 27 January 2022, at the age of 85.

References 

1936 births
2022 deaths
People from Trebinje
Bosniaks of Bosnia and Herzegovina
Yugoslav footballers
Association football forwards
Yugoslav First League players
FK Leotar players
FK Sarajevo players
GNK Dinamo Zagreb players